Giovanni Paisiello (or Paesiello; 9 May 1740 – 5 June 1816) was an Italian composer of the Classical era, and was the most popular opera composer of the late 1700s. His operatic style influenced Mozart and Rossini.

Life

Paisiello was born in Taranto in the Apulia region and educated by the Jesuits there. He became known for his beautiful singing voice and in 1754 was sent to the Conservatorio di S. Onofrio at Naples, where he studied under Francesco Durante, and eventually became assistant master. For the theatre of the Conservatorio, which he left in 1763, he wrote some intermezzi, one of which attracted so much notice that he was invited to write two operas, La Pupilla and Il Mondo al Rovescio, for Bologna, and a third, Il Marchese di Tidipano, for Rome.

His reputation now firmly established, he settled for some years at Naples, where, despite the popularity of Niccolò Piccinni, Domenico Cimarosa and Pietro Guglielmi, of whose triumphs he was bitterly jealous, he produced a series of highly successful operas, one of which, L'ldolo cinese, made a deep impression upon the Neapolitan public. The young Mozart and his father met him in Bologna in 1771.

In 1772 Paisiello began to write church music, and composed a requiem for Gennara di Borbone, of the reigning dynasty. In the same year he married Cecilia Pallini, and the marriage was a happy one. In 1776 Paisiello was invited by the empress Catherine the Great of Russia to Saint Petersburg, where he remained for eight years, producing, among other charming works, his masterpiece, Il barbiere di Siviglia, which soon attained a European reputation. The fate of this opera marks an epoch in the history of Italian art; for with it the gentle suavity cultivated by the masters of the 18th century died out to make room for the dazzling brilliance of a later period.

When, in 1816, Gioachino Rossini set a revised version of the libretto to music, under the title of Almaviva ossia la inutil precauzione the fans of Paisiello stormed the stage. Rossini's opera, now known as Il barbiere di Siviglia, is now acknowledged as Rossini's greatest work, while Paisiello's opera is only infrequently produced—a strange instance of poetical vengeance, since Paisiello himself had many years previously endeavoured to eclipse the fame of Giovanni Battista Pergolesi by resetting the libretto of his famous intermezzo, La serva padrona.

Paisiello left Russia in 1784, and, after producing Il Re Teodoro at Vienna, entered the service of Ferdinand IV of Naples, where he composed many of his best operas, including Nina and La Molinara. The Irish tenor Michael Kelly witnessed another meeting between Paisiello and Mozart when he visited Vienna later that year. Mozart had just finished a string of piano concertos, K. 449 and 453, written for his pupil Barbara Ployer. When Ployer’s father arranged a performance at his summer estate in Döbling, Mozart wrote to his father, "Fräulein Babette will play her new concerto in G and I shall play the Quintet and then we’ll perform together the grand sonata for two pianos. I shall fetch Paisiello with my carriage for I want him to hear my compositions as well as my pupil."  After many vicissitudes, resulting from political and dynastic changes, he was invited to Paris (1802) by Napoleon, whose favor he had won five years previously by composing a march for the funeral of General Hoche. Napoleon treated him munificently, while cruelly neglecting two more famous composers, Luigi Cherubini and Étienne Méhul, to whom the new favorite transferred the hatred he had formerly borne to Cimarosa, Guglielmi and Piccinni.

Paisiello is known to have composed 94 operas, which are known for their gracefully beautiful melodies. Perhaps the best-known tune he ever wrote is "Nel cor più non mi sento" from La Molinara, immortalized when Beethoven composed  piano variations based on it. Paganini also wrote  violin variations based on the same tune. Another favourite vocal piece is "Chi vuol la zingarella" from I zingari in fiera, that vividly portrays the scene of an attractive gypsy girl with its dramatic music. Paisiello also wrote a great deal of church music, including eight masses; as well as fifty-one instrumental compositions and many stand-alone songs. He also composed the Inno al Re, the national anthem of the Kingdom of the Two Sicilies. Manuscript scores of many of his operas were presented to the library of the British Museum by Domenico Dragonetti.

The library of the Gerolamini at Naples possesses an interesting manuscript compilation recording Paisiello's opinions on contemporary composers, and exhibiting him as a somewhat severe critic, especially of the work of Pergolesi.

The Grove Concise Dictionary of Music notes that "Paisiello was one of the most successful and influential opera composers of his time. Most of his over 80 operas are comic and use a simple, direct and spirited style, latterly with sharper characterization, more colorful scoring and warmer melodies (features that influenced Mozart). His serious operas have less than the conventional amount of virtuoso vocal writing; those for Russia are the closest to Gluck's 'reform' approach."

Works

Operas
 R 1.00 La moglie in calzoni (18.2.1764, Modena)
 R 1.01 Il ciarlone (12.5.1764, Bologna) – lost
 R 1.02 I francesi brillanti (24.6.1764, Bologna)
 R 1.03 Madama l'umorista, o Gli stravaganti (26.1.1765, Modena) – lost
 R 1.04 L'amore in ballo (carnival 1765, Venice S Moisè)
 R 1.05 La mascherata delle nozze di Bacco e d'Arianna (11.2.1765, Modena)
 I bagni d'Abano (spring 1765, Parma)
 Il negligente (1765, Parma)
 Pulcinella vendicato nel ritorno di marechiaro (1765, Naples, Teatro Bellini)
 R 1.05a Le virtuose ridicole (1765, Parma)
 R 1.06 Le nozze disturbate (carnival 1776, Venice S Moisè)
 R 1.07 Le finte contesse (2.1766, Rome Valle) [Il Marchese di Tulissano?]
 R 1.08 La vedova di bel genio (spring 1766, Naples, Teatro Nuovo)
 R 1.09 Le 'mbroglie de le Bajasse (carnival 1767, Naples) – lost
 R 1.09a La serva fatta padrona (summer 1769, Naples) 2nd version of Le 'mbroglie de le Bajasse
 R 1.10 L'idolo cinese (spring 1767, Naples, Teatro Nuovo)
 R 1.11 Licenza to L'idolo cinese
 R 1.12 Lucio Papirio dittatore (summer 1767, Naples, Teatro di S Carlo)
 R 1.13 Il furbo malaccorto (winter 1767, Naples, Teatro Nuovo)
 R 1.14 Alceste in Ebuda, ovvero Olimpia (20.1.1768, Naples, Teatro di S Carlo)
 R 1.15 Le nozze di Peleo e Tetide (31.5.1768, Naples PR) [Festa teatrale in musica]
 R 1.16 Licenza to Peleo
 R 1.17 La luna abitata (summer 1768, Naples, Teatro Nuovo)
 R 1.18 La finta maga per vendetta (autumn? 1768, Naples, Teatro dei Fiorentini)
 R 1.19 L'osteria di Marechiaro (winter 1768, Naples, Teatro dei Fiorentini)
 R 1.20 La Claudia vendicata (performed as act III of L'osteria 1770, Naples)
 R 1.21 Don Chisciotte della Mancia (summer 1769, Naples, Teatro dei Fiorentini)
 R 1.22 L'arabo cortese (winter 1769 Naples, Teatro Nuovo)
 R 1.23 La Zelmira, o sia La marina del Granatello (summer 1770 Naples, Teatro Nuovo)
 R 1.24 Le trame per amore (7.10.1770 Naples, Teatro Nuovo)
 R 1.25 Demetrio (Lent 1771, Modena)
 R 1.26 Annibale in Torino (16.1.1771 Turin, Teatro Regio di Torino)
 R 1.27 La somiglianza de' nomi (spring 1771 Naples, Teatro Nuovo)
 R 1.28 and 1.29 I scherzi d'amore e di fortuna (summer 1771 Naples, Teatro Nuovo)
 R 1.30 Artaserse (26.12.1771 Modena)
 R 1.31 Semiramide in villa (carnival 1772 Rome, Teatro Capranica)
 R 1.32 Motezuma (1.1772 Rome, Dame)
 R 1.33 La Dardanè (spring 1772 Naples, Teatro Nuovo)
 R 1.34 Gli amante comici (autumn 1772 Naples, Teatro Nuovo)
 Don Anchise Campanone (1773 Venice) [rev. Gli amante comici]
 R 1.35 L'innocente fortunata (carnival 1773 Venice S Moisè)
 R 1.36 Sismano nel Mogol (carnival 1773 Milan, Teatro Regio Ducale)
 R 1.37 Il tamburo (spring 1773 Naples, Teatro Nuovo) [Il tamburo notturno]
 R 1.38 La semplice fortunata (summer 1773, Naples)
 R 1.39 Alessandro nell'Indie (26.12.1773 Modena) – fragment
 R 1.40 Andromeda (carnival 1774 Milan, Teatro Regio Ducale)
 R 1.41 Il duello (spring 1774 Naples, Teatro Nuovo)
 R 1.42 Il credulo deluso (autumn 1774 Naples, Teatro Nuovo)
 R 1.43 La frascatana (autumn 1774 Venice, S Samuele) [L'infante de Zamora]
 R 1.44 Il divertimento dei numi (4.12.1774 Naples, Reale)
 R 1.45 Demofoonte (carnival 1775 Venice, S Benedetto)
 R 1.46 La discordia fortunata (carnival 1775 Venice, S Samuele) [L'avaro deluso]
 R 1.47 Le astuzie amorose (spring 1775 Naples, Teatro Nuovo)
 R 1.48 Socrate immaginario (autumn 1775 Naples, Teatro Nuovo)
 R 1.49 Il gran Cid (3.11.1775 Florence, Teatro La Pergola)
 R 1.50 Le due contesse (3.1.1776 Rome, Teatro Capranica in Palazzo alla Valle)
 R 1.51 La disfatta di Dario (carnival 1776 Rome, Teatro Argentina)
 R 1.52 Dal finto il vero (spring 1776 Naples, Teatro Nuovo)
 R 1.53 Il finto spettro (26.12.1776, Mannheim)
 R 1.54 Nitteti (28.1.1777 St. Petersburg)
 R 1.55 Lucinda e Armidoro (autumn1777 St. Petersburg)
 R 1.56 Achille in Sciro (6.2.1778 St. Petersburg)
 R 1.57 Lo sposo burlato (24.7.1778 St. Petersburg)
 R 1.58 Gli astrologi immaginari (14.2.1779 St. Petersburg, Hermitage) [I filosofi immaginari], [Le philosophe imaginaire]
 R 1.59 Demetrio (13.6.1779, Tsarskoye Selo)
 R 1.60 Il matrimonio inaspettato (1779 Kammenïy Ostrov) [La contadina di spirito]
 R 1.61 La finta amante (5.6.1780 Mogilev) [Camiletta]
 R 1.62 Alcide al bivio (6.12.1780 St. Petersburg, Hermitage)
 R 1.63 La serva padrona (10?.9.1781 Tsarskoye Selo)
 Il duello comico (1782 Tsarskoye Selo) [rev. Il duello]
 R 1.64 Il barbiere di Siviglia, ovvero La precauzione inutile (26.9.1782 St. Petersburg)
 R 1.65 Il mondo della luna (1782 Kammenïy Ostrov)
 R 1.66 Il re Teodoro in Venezia (23.8.1784 Vienna, Burg)
 R 1.67 Antigono (12.10.1785 Naples, Teatro di S Carlo)
 R 1.68 L'amor ingegnoso, o sia La giovane scaltra (carnival 1785 Padua)
 R 1.69 La grotta di Trofonio (12.1785 Naples, Teatro dei Fiorentini)
 R 1.70 Olimpiade (20.1.1786 Naples, Teatro di S Carlo)
 R 1.71 Le gare generose (spring 1786 Naples, Teatro dei Fiorentini) [Gli schiavi per amore; Le bon maître, ou L'esclave par amour]
 R 1.72 Pirro (12.1.1787 Naples, Teatro di S Carlo)
 Il barbiere di Siviglia, ovvero La precauzione inutile [rev] (1787 Naples, Teatro dei Fiorentini)
 R 1.73 Giunone e Lucina (8.9.1787 Naples, Teatro di S Carlo)
 R 1.74 La modista raggiratrice (autumn 1787 Naples, Teatro dei Fiorentini) [La scuffiara amante, o sia Il maestro di scuola napolitano; La scuffiara raggiratrice]
 R 1.75 Fedra (1.1.1788 Naples, Teatro di S Carlo)
 R 1.76 L'amor contrastato (carnival 1789 Naples, Teatro dei Fiorentini) [L'amor contrastato o sia La molinarella]
 R 1.77 Catone in Utica (5.2.1789 Naples, Teatro di S Carlo)
 R 1.78 Nina, o sia La pazza per amore (25.6.1789 Caserta)
 R 1.79 I zingari in fiera (21.11.1789 Naples, Teatro dei Fiorentini)
 R 1.80 Le vane gelosie (spring 1790 Naples, Teatro dei Fiorentini)
 R 1.81 Zenobia in Palmira (30.5.1790 Naples, Teatro di S Carlo)
 La molinara (1790 Vienna) [rev. L'amor contrastato]
 Nina, o sia La pazza per amore [rev] (1790 Naples, Teatro dei Fiorentini)
 R 1.82 Ipermestra (6.1791 Padua)
 R 1.83 La locanda (16.6.1791 London Pantheon) [La locanda di falcone; Lo stambo in Berlina]
 R 1.84 I giuochi d'Agrigento (16.5.1792 Venice, Fenice)
 Il fanatico in Berlina (1792 Naples, Teatro dei Fiorentini) [rev. La locanda]
 R 1.85 Il ritorno d'Idomeneo in Creta (autumn 1792 Perugia) – lost
 R 1.86 Elfrida (4.11.1792 Naples, Teatro di S Carlo) [Adevolto]
 R 1.87 Elvira (12.1.1794 Naples, Teatro di S Carlo)
 R 1.88 Didone abbandonata (4.11.1794 Naples, Teatro di S Carlo)
 Nina, o sia La pazza per amore [rev 2] (1795 Naples, Teatro dei Fiorentini)
 Chi la dura la vince (9.6.1797 Milan S)
 R 1.89 La Daunia felice (26.6.1797 Foggia, Palazzo Dogana)
 R 1.90 Andromaca (4.11.1797 Naples, Teatro di S Carlo)
 R 1.91 L'inganno felice (1798 Naples, Teatro dei Fiorentini)
 R 1.92 L'isola disabitata (3.7.1799, Lisbon) – lost
 R 1.93 La Pace
 R 1.94 Proserpine (28.3.1803 Paris, Opéra)
 R 1.95 Elisa (19.3.1807 Naples, Teatro di S Carlo) [+ Mayr]
 R 1.96 I pittagorici (19.3.1808 Naples, Teatro di S Carlo)

Secular cantatas
 R 2.01 – L'Ebone (lost)
 R 2.02 – La sorpresa delli Dei (lost)
 R 2.03 – 2 Notturni
 R 2.04 – La Partenza
 R 2.05 – La Libertà e Palinodia a Nice
 R 2.06 – Il Ritorno di Perseo
 R 2.07 – Amor vendicato
 R 2.08 – Il Genio Poetico Appagato
 R 2.09 – Cantata epitalamica (lost)
 R 2.10 – Canone a 4 voci
 R 2.11 – Le nozze di Silvio e Clori
 R 2.12 – La Volontaria
 R 2.13 – Il mio bene, il mio tesoro
 R 2.14 – Birthday Cantata for Prince Felice of Lucca
 R 2.15 – Tirsi a Fille
 R 2.16 – Fille a Tirsi
 R 2.17 – La Lontananza di Tirsi
 R 2.18 – La scusa
 R 2.19 – Riede omai la nuova aurora
 R 2.20 – 3 Notturni for 2 sopranos

Oratorios, passions and sacred cantatas
 R 3.01 – Jephte sacrificium (lost)
 R 3.02 – La Passione di Nostro Signor Gesù Cristo
 R 3.03 – Passio secundum Mattheum
 R 3.04 – Passio di San Giovanni
 R 3.05 – Il transito di San Luigi Gansaga
 R 3.06 – Cantata fatta in occasione della transalazione del sangue di S. Gennaro
 R 3.07 – Baldassare
 R 3.08 – Cantata per la Sollenit‡ del SS. Corpo di Cristo
 R 3.09 – Cantata per la transalazione del sangue del glorioso martire S. Gennaro
 R 3.10 – Il fonte prodigioso di Orebre (lost)
 R 3.11 – Passio per la domenica delle Palme
 R 3.12 – Passio per il venerdi Santo

Sacred music for rulers' chapels
Works composed for Napoleon's or King Joseph's chapels.
 R 4.01 – Virgam virtutis tuae in F major
 R 4.02 – Mass in F major
 R 4.03 – Absit sonitus tubae in D major
 R 4.04 – Mass in A major
 R 4.05 – Veni ferox, veni in G minor
 R 4.06 – Mass in C major
 R 4.07 – Splendete o coeli in G major
 R 4.08 – Mass in G major
 R 4.09 – Coeli stella amica in E-flat major
 R 4.10 – Mass in F major
 R 4.11 – Non est in vita amara in C major
 R 4.12 – Mass in B-flat major
 R 4.13 – Messa in Pastorale per il Natale in G major
 R 4.14 – Mass for Passion and Palm Sundays in F major
 R 4.15 – Veni sancte spiritus in E-flat major
 R 4.16 – Mass for the coronation of Napoleon I in B-flat major
 R 4.17 – Deh resplende o clara stella in D major
 R 4.18 – Gratiae sint Deo devotae in E-flat major
 R 4.19 – Splendete o coeli in G major
 R 4.20 – Sitibundi desolati in D minor
 R 4.21 – Alma fax et casti in E-flat major
 R 4.22 – Mass in D major
 R 4.23 – Ne lucem Bene in B-flat major
 R 4.24 – Altas Olympi fores in A major
 R 4.25 – Rosae lux e coelo in A major
 R 4.26 – Mass in F major
 R 4.27 – Vivat Deus in C major
 R 4.28 – Si mare ferox murmurat in F major
 R 4.29 – Coeli stella amica in E-flat major
 R 4.30 – Non est in vita amara in C major
 R 4.31 – Heu nos jam velum in E-flat major
 R 4.32 – Quis est? in C major
 R 4.33 – Mass in C major
 R 4.34 – Absit sonitus tubae in D major
 R 4.35 – In tuo beato ardore in G major
 R 4.36 – O mortales summo ardore in D major
 R 4.37 – Mass in D major
 R 4.38 – Mass for the Assumption of the Blessed Virgin Mary in G major (1809)
 R 4.39 – Sagro trattenimento musicale in B-flat major
 R 4.40 – Sagro componimento musicale in C major
 R 4.41 – Sagro componimento musicale in G major
 R 4.42 – Mass for the Assumption of the Blessed Virgin Mary in G major (1811)
 R 4.43 – Mass in E-flat major
 R 4.44 – Mass for the Assumption of the Blessed Virgin Mary in C major
 R 4.45 – Mass in B-flat major
 R 4.46 – Te Deum breve in G major
 R 4.47 – Laudate pueri in E minor
 R 4.48 – Salvum fac Domine in B-flat major

Masses (other than those for rulers' chapels)
 R 5.01 – Missa Defunctorum in C minor
 R 5.02 – Mass in G major
 R 5.03 – Mass in D major
 R 5.04 – Mass in F major
 R 5.05 – Mass in D major
 R 5.06 – Mass in B-flat major
 R 5.07 – Agnus Dei in G major
 R 5.08 – Mass in F major
 R 5.09 – Mass in C major
 R 5.10 – Mass in F major
 R 5.11 – Mass in C major (doubtful)

Pieces for the Mass Ordinary
 R 5.51 – Introit, offertory and communion for the mass in F major
 R 5.52 – Introit, kyrie and offertory
 R 5.53 – Introit, gradual, offertory, post-communion and responsory
 R 5.54 – Gradual: Omnes de Saba venient in G major
 R 5.55 – Offertory: Te gloriosus chorus in D major

Psalms, hymns or antiphons used during Mass
 R 5.56 – Veni sancte spiritus in D major
 R 5.57 – Exsulta jam cor meum in D major
 R 5.58 – Stabat Mater del Pergolese in C minor
 R 5.59 – Libera me Domine in D minor
 R 5.60 – Caro mea vere est cibus in B-flat major
 R 5.61 – Benedictus Rex in B-flat major

Psalms, canticles, hymns or antiphons
 R 6.01 – Te Deum in B-flat major
 R 6.02 – Te Deum in C major
 R 6.03 – Hymn: O salutaris hostia in A major
 R 6.04 – Dixit Dominus in A major
 R 6.05 – Antiphon: Domine ad adjuvandum in F major
 R 6.06 – Dixit Dominus in F major
 R 6.07 – Antiphon: Domine ad adjuvandum in G major
 R 6.08 – Dixit Dominus in C major
 R 6.09 – Dixit Dominus in D major
 R 6.10 – Dixit Dominus in G major
 R 6.11 – Dixit Dominus in D major
 R 6.12 – Dixit Dominus in G major
 R 6.13 – Psalm: Confitebor tibi in A major
 R 6.14 – Psalm: Laudate pueri in E-flat major
 R 6.15 – Psalm: Laudate pueri in C major
 R 6.16 – Psalm: Laudate pueri in C major
 R 6.17 – Psalm: Laetatus sum in D minor
 R 6.18 – Psalm: Magnificat in C major
 R 6.19 – Psalm: Magnificat in G major
 R 6.20 – Litany in G major
 R 6.21 – Responsoria Nativitatis Domini in E minor
 R 6.22 – Responsori per la settimana santa
 R 6.23 – Responsori per Giovedi Santo
 R 6.24 – Responsori per Venerdi Santo
 R 6.25 – Lamentazione prima in C major
 R 6.26 – Lamentazione seconda in G major
 R 6.26 – Lamentazione terza in F major
 R 6.28 – Lezione per la sera del Giovedi Santo
 R 6.29 – Christus factus est in A minor
 R 6.30 – Miserere a 5 in D minor
 R 6.31 – Hymn: Pange lingua in C minor
 R 6.32 – Hymn: Tantum ergo in A major
 R 6.33 – 3 Tantum ergo for soprano
 R 6.34 – Hymn: Tantum ergo in C major
 R 6.35 – Antiphon: Benedicat in F major
 R 6.36 – Antiphon: Regina coeli in B-flat major
 R 6.37 – Antiphon: Salve Regina in E-flat major
 R 6.38 – Antiphon: Ave maris stella in F major

Motets
(to be completed)
 R 7.01 – Motet: Astra coeli in C major
 R 7.02 – Motet: O luminosa aurora in G major
 R 7.03 – Motet: In corde intrepido in C major
 R 7.04 – Motet: Mille furis in C major
 R 7.05 – Motet: Absit sonitus in D major

Instrumental works
 R 8.01 – String Quartet No.1 in C major
 R 8.02 – String Quartet No.2 in A major
 R 8.03 – String Quartet No.3 in D major
 R 8.04 – String Quartet No.4 in E-flat major
 R 8.05 – String Quartet No.5 in E flat major
 R 8.06 – String Quartet No.6 in C major
 R 8.07 – String Quartet No.7 in E-flat major
 R 8.08 – String Quartet No.8 in G major
 R 8.09 – String Quartet No.9 in A major
 R 8.10 – Keyboard Concerto No.1 in C major
 R 8.11 – Keyboard Concerto No.2 in F major
 R 8.12 – 4 Divertimenti for winds in E-flat major
 R 8.13 – 12 Divertimenti for winds
 R 8.14 – Collection of rondos and capriccios for keyboard
 R 8.15 – Keyboard Concerto No.3 in A major
 R 8.16 – Keyboard Concerto No.4 in G minor
 R 8.17 – Keyboard Concerto No.5 in D major
 R 8.18 – Keyboard Concerto No.6 in B-flat major
 R 8.19 – Keyboard Concerto No.7 in A major
 R 8.20 – Keyboard Concerto No.8 in C major
 R 8.21 – Violin Sonata in E major
 R 8.22 – Marche funèbre pour le Général Hoche in C minor
 R 8.23 – Andante for horn and harp in C major
 R 8.24 – 3 Pieces for Military Band
 R 8.25 – Symphony in C major

Works of doubtful authenticity
 R E.02 – Sinfonia in E-flat major
 R E.06 – Flute Quartet Op. 23 No.2 in D major
 R E.07 – Flute Quartet Op. 23 No.5 in G major
 R E.08 – Flute Quartet Op. 23 No.4 in G major
 R E.09 – Flute Quartet Op. 23 No.1 in C major
 R E.10 – Flute Quartet Op. 23 No.3 in E minor
 R E.11 – Flute Quartet Op. 23 No.6 in G major
 R E.13 – Marche du Premier Consul in B-flat major
 R 8.14 – Mandolin concerto in E-flat major
 R 8.15 – Mandolin concerto in C major
 R 8.16 – Mandolin concerto in G major

Educational treatises
 Regole per bene accompagnare il partimento o sia il basso fondamentale sopra il Cembalo
 298 Disposizione over partimenti by Giovanni Paisiello, in two large handwritten volumes. Presumably written by his student in composition Auguste Louis de Talleyrand. The name 'Taleyrand' appears on the inside of the cover of volume 2. Besides the 45 partimenti from Paisiello's Regole per bene accompagnare, the Taleyrand dispositions contain 41 partimenti that had not been previously known. These volumes are preserved in the Bibliothèque Nationale de France (F-Pn Rés Vmb Ms. 10/1 and 10/2).

Editions
 Stefano Faglia, Franca Saini (ed.): Il Mondo della Luna, Saint Petersburg, 1783. Monza, Accademia Musicale IAMR, 2006. Parma, L'oca del Cairo Edizioni Musicali, 2006.

References

Further reading

External links

 
 
 Score manuscripts and publications by Giovanni Paisiello on archive.org
 John A. Rice, "Elisabeth Vigée-Lebrun's Portrait of Giovanni Paisiello"
 John A. Rice, "Opera Seria in Theory and Practice: Alessandro Pepoli's 'Lettera ad un uomo ragionevole sul melodramma detto serio' (1790) and His Libretto for Paisiello's I giuochi d'Agrigento (1792)

1740 births
1816 deaths
18th-century Italian musicians
18th-century Italian male musicians
19th-century Italian musicians
19th-century Italian male musicians
Italian Classical-period composers
Neapolitan school composers
Italian male classical composers
Italian opera composers
Male opera composers
People from Taranto
String quartet composers